Host Hotels & Resorts, Inc. is an American real estate investment trust that invests in hotels. As of February 19, 2021, the company owned 80 upscale hotels containing approximately 46,500 rooms in the United States, Brazil, and Canada.

History
In 1897, the Van Noy Brothers of Kansas City, Missouri, formed Van Noy Railway News and Hotel Company to operate news stands along the Missouri Pacific and other regional railroads. The company later expanded to various hospitality services, including hotels. After several name and business changes it became the Host International Company in 1968. It was acquired by Marriott Corporation in 1982. In 1995, Marriott divided its business into two companies, naming one Host Marriott. The company continued to manage travel concessions at airports and along turnpikes and interstate highways. These concession businesses were further spun off as Host Marriott Services, or HMSHost. After divesting its non-hotel business and reorganizing as a real estate investment trust, it adopted its current name in 2006.

References

External links

American companies established in 1993
Hospitality companies established in 1993
Real estate companies established in 1993
Financial services companies established in 1993
Companies listed on the Nasdaq
Companies formerly listed on the New York Stock Exchange
Hospitality companies of the United States
Marriott International
Real estate investment trusts of the United States
Companies based in Bethesda, Maryland
Corporate spin-offs